Ein Traumspiel is a German-language opera by Aribert Reimann after the 1901 play A Dream Play (Swedish: Ett drömspel) by August Strindberg. Carla Henius arranged the translation to German by Peter Weiss for a libretto. Reimann composed the opera in 1963 and 1964 on a commission from Theater Kiel. Gielen stepped in for the Generalmusikdirektor who was ill.

References

External links
, Theater Hof, 2018

German-language operas
1965 operas
Adaptations of works by August Strindberg
Operas based on plays
Operas by Aribert Reimann
Operas